Smith House may refer to:

In the United States

Arkansas
William H. Smith House, Atlanta
Smith House (Bentonville, Arkansas)
Rowland B. Smith House, Camden
S.G. Smith House, Conway
Joel Smith House, El Dorado
Tom Smith House, Elkins
Jessie B. Smith House, Fordyce
A.J. Smith House, Griffithville
Smith House (Searcy, Arkansas)
Smith House (Wheatley, Arkansas)

Arizona
Walter Lee Smith House, Phoenix, listed on the NRHP
Jesse N. Smith House (Snowflake, Arizona), listed on the NRHP
Professor George E. P. Smith House, Tucson, listed on the NRHP
J. Homer Smith House, Yuma, listed on the NRHP

California
Williams Smith House, Napa, listed on the NRHP
Ernest W. Smith House, Pasadena

Colorado
William Smith House (Aurora, Colorado)
Milo A. Smith House, Denver, listed on the NRHP
Pierce T. Smith House, Denver, listed on the NRHP
Smith House (Denver, Colorado), listed on the NRHP

Connecticut
Frederick J. Smith House, Darian
Samuel Smith House (East Lyme, Connecticut)
Smith-Harris House (East Lyme, Connecticut)
Jabez Smith House, Groton
Shubel Smith House, Ledyard

Florida
Dr. Chandler Holmes Smith House, Madison
E. C. Smith House, Ocala

Georgia
W. E. Smith House, Albany, listed on the NRHP
Tullie Smith House, Atlanta
Jim Smith House, Lyons
Archibald Smith House, Roswell
Dr. Robert L. and Sarah Alberta Smith House, Sharpsburg, listed on the NRHP
Thomas W. Smith House, Tennille, listed on the NRHP
Smith-Harris House (Vesta, Georgia), listed on the NRHP
Robert Shand Smith House, Washington, listed on the NRHP

Idaho
Nathan Smith House, Boise, listed on the NRHP
Henry Smith House (Challis, Idaho), listed on the NRHP
C. Harvey Smith House, Twin Falls, listed on the NRHP

Illinois
George W. Smith House (Oak Park, Illinois)
Ephraim Smith House, Sugar Grove

Indiana
Henry W. Smith House, Kokomo
John W. Smith House, Rochester
Everel S. Smith House, Westville

Iowa
Smith Farmhouse (Lake City, Iowa)
John Smith House (Le Claire, Iowa)
Alvord I. Smith House, Davenport
Henry H. Smith/J.H. Murphy House, Davenport
James Smith House (Davenport, Iowa)
William G. Smith House (Davenport, Iowa)
Gen. Cass and Belle Smith House, Lake City
Peter and Mary Smith House, Lake City
Hiram C. Smith House, Winterset

Kansas
Edwin Smith House (Wellington, Kansas)
H.F. Smith House, Wellington

Kentucky
George W. Smith House (Elizabethtown, Kentucky), Elizabethtown, listed on the NRHP
Nelson and Clifton Rodes Smith House, Georgetown, listed on the NRHP
Dr. William Addison Smith House, Georgetown, listed on the NRHP
David H. Smith House, Hodgenville, listed on the NRHP
Enoch Smith House, Mount Sterling, listed on the NRHP
F.A. Smith House, Munfordville, listed on the NRHP
Thomas Smith House (New Castle, Kentucky), listed on the NRHP
Maj. Hampden Smith House, Owensboro, listed on the NRHP
Smith House (Paint Lick, Kentucky), listed on the NRHP
William Alexander Smith House, Peewee Valley, listed on the NRHP
Smith House (Shawhan, Kentucky), listed on the NRHP
Smith House (Somerset, Kentucky), listed on the NRHP
Beecher Smith House, Somerset, listed on the NRHP
Levi J. Smith House, Springfield, listed on the NRHP

Louisiana
Smith House (Franklin, Louisiana), listed on the NRHP
Clifford Percival Smith House, Houma, listed on the NRHP

Maine
Zebulon Smith House, Bangor
James Smith Homestead, Kennebunk
George W. Smith Homestead,	Mattawamkeag
Parson Smith House, South Windham

Maryland
William S. Smith House, Oriole
Harry Smith House (Riverdale Park, Maryland)
Gov. John Walter Smith House, Snow Hill

Massachusetts
Thomas and Esther Smith House, Agawam
Matthias Smith House, Barnstable
John J. Smith House, Boston
John Mace Smith House, Fall River
Smith House (Ipswich, Massachusetts)
James Smith House (Needham, Massachusetts)
Curtis S. Smith House, Newton
Marshall Smith House, Waltham
Perez Smith House, Waltham
Ellen M. Smith Three-Decker, Worcester

Michigan
LeRoy Smith House, Algonac
Smith-Dengler House, Calument Township
Samuel L. Smith House, Detroit
Melvyn Maxwell and Sara Stein Smith House, Pontiac
Smith-Culhane House, Port Austin
George and Mary Pine Smith House, Sheldon
Smith House (Vassar, Michigan)

Minnesota
W.W. Smith House, Sleepy Eye, listed on the NRHP
H. Alden Smith House, Minneapolis
Lena O. Smith House, Minneapolis

Mississippi
Charles F. Smith House, Canton, listed on the NRHP
A.L. Smith House, Monticello, listed on the NRHP

Missouri
Smith House (Florissant, Missouri), listed on the NRHP
James Smith House (Grandin, Missouri)
Lawrence Smith House, Grandin
William F. Smith House, Grandin

Montana
T.W. Smith House, Joliet, listed on the NRHP
Smith House (Kalispell, Montana), listed on the NRHP

Nebraska
Woral C. Smith Lime Kiln and Limestone House, Fairbury, listed on the NRHP
George W. Smith House (Geneva, Nebraska), Geneva, listed on the NRHP

Nevada
Jay Dayton Smith House, Las Vegas

New Hampshire
Gov. John Butler Smith House, Hillsborough
Simeon P. Smith House, Portsmouth

New Jersey
Nathaniel Smith House, Berkeley Heights
David V. Smith House, Elmer
John Smith House (Mahwah, New Jersey), listed on the NRHP
Bridget Smith House, Mine Hill Township, listed on the NRHP
S.C. Smith House, Montclair, listed on the NRHP
John Smith House (Morristown, New Jersey), listed on the NRHP
Thomas Smith House (Mount Laurel, New Jersey), listed on the NRHP
William Smith House (Salem, New Jersey), listed on the NRHP
J. Harper Smith Mansion, Somerville Borough, listed on the NRHP
Albert Smith House (Waldwick, New Jersey), Waldwick

New York
Frank W. Smith House, Amityville, listed on the NRHP
Augustus A. Smith House, Attica
Adon Smith House, Hamilton
Daniel Smith House (Huntington, New York)
George J. Smith House, Kingston
John Smith House (Kingston, New York)
The Smith House (Montgomery, New York)
Alfred E. Smith House, New York
Gerrit Smith Estate, Peterboro
Almeron and Olive Smith House, Plandome
Stephen and Charles Smith House, Roslyn Harbor
Reuel E. Smith House, Skaneateles
Obadiah Smith House, Smithtown
Jacob Smith House, West Hills

North Carolina
Whitford G. Smith House, Asheville
William G. Smith House (Bullock, North Carolina)
Francis Marion Smith House, Gibsonville
Benjamin Smith House (New Bern, North Carolina)
William E. Smith House, Selma
William Rankin and Elizabeth Wharton Smith House, Whitsett
Frank and Mary Smith House, Willow Spring
Turner and Amelia Smith House, Willow Spring

Ohio
Dr. Robert Smith House, Akron
David Smith House, Clinton, listed on the NRHP
William Smith House (Clinton, Ohio), listed on the NRHP
Benjamin Smith House (Columbus, Ohio), listed on the NRHP
Edwin Smith House (Dayton, Ohio)
Charles William and Anna Smith House, Elyria, listed on the NRHP
Samuel Smith House and Tannery, Greenfield
William R. Smith House, Zanesville, listed on the NRHP

Oregon
Andrew Smith House, Dayton, listed on the NRHP
Alvin T. Smith House, Forest Grove
Herbert and Katherine Smith House, Grants Pass, listed on the NRHP
Lame–Smith House, Halsey
Bernard Pitzer Smith House, Myrtle Creek, listed on the NRHP
John T. Smith House, Newberg, listed on the NRHP
Alfred H. and Mary E. Smith House, Portland
Blaine Smith House, Portland
Milton W. Smith House, Portland
Percy A. Smith House, near Portland
Mary J.G. Smith House, Portland, listed on the NRHP
Stanley C.E. Smith House, near Portland, listed on the NRHP
Walter V. Smith House, Portland
Henry Clay Smith House, Winston, listed on the NRHP

Pennsylvania
William Smith House (Wrightstown, Pennsylvania)

Rhode Island
Joseph Smith House, North Providence

South Carolina
J. Warren Smith House, Liberty

South Dakota
William P. Smith House (Stickney, South Dakota)

Tennessee
Alexander Smith House (Brentwood, Tennessee)
Christopher H. Smith House, Clarksville, listed on the NRHP
Warner Price Mumford Smith House, Mount Juliet
Dr. Benjamin Franklin Smith House, Waco

Texas
John Sterling Smith Jr. House, Chappell Hill, Texas, NRHP-listed in Washington County
W. D. Smith House, McKinney, TX, NRHP-listed in Collin County
Smith House (San Marcos, Texas), NRHP-listed in Hays County

Utah
Warren B. Smith House, American Fork
Ellen Smith House, Beaver, listed on the NRHP
Seth W. Smith House, Beaver, listed on the NRHP
William P. Smith House (Beaver, Utah), listed on the NRHP
Joseph M. and Celestia Smith House, Draper, listed on the NRHP
Lauritz H. and Emma Smith House, Draper
Lauritz Smith House, Draper
Mary Smith House, Draper
Thomas J. and Amanda N. Smith House, Kaysville, listed on the NRHP
John Y. and Emerette C. Smith House, Lehi
William McNeil Smith House, Logan, listed on the NRHP
Jesse N. Smith House (Parowan, Utah), listed on the NRHP
Hannah Maria Libby Smith House, Provo
George Albert Smith House, Salt Lake City, listed on the NRHP
Francis 'Frank' and Eunice Smith House, Vernal, listed on the NRHP

Vermont
Simeon Smith House (West Haven, Vermont)
Simeon Smith Mansion, West Haven

Virginia
Marshall-Rucker-Smith House, Charlottesville
William Smith House (Hamilton, Virginia)

Washington
Nat Smith House, Kelso, listed on the NRHP
Edwin A. Smith House, Spokane, listed on the NRHP

West Virginia
Michael Smith House, Cedarville
Silas P. Smith Opera House, West Union
Elven C. Smith House, Williamson

Wisconsin
Francis West Smith House, Brodhead, NRHP-listed in Green County 
John Smith House (Clinton, Wisconsin), NRHP-listed in Rock Count
J.B. Smith House and Granary, Green Bay, NRHP-listed in Brown County
Richard C. Smith House, Jefferson
T. C. Smith House, Lake Geneva, NRHP-listed in Walworth County
Alexander Smith House (Madison, Wisconsin)
Villa Terrace Decorative Arts Museum, Milwaukee, also known as the Lloyd R. Smith House, NRHP-listed
Charles R. Smith House, Neenah, NRHP-listed in Winnebago County
Henry Spencer Smith House, Neenah, NRHP-listed in Winnebago County
Hiram Smith House, Neenah
Daniel Smith House (Prescott, Wisconsin), NRHP-listed in Pierce County
Adam and Mary Smith House, Sun Prairie
Camillia Smith House, Waukesha, NRHP-listed in Waukesha County

See also
Smith Farm (disambiguation)
Smith Building (disambiguation)
Smith-Harris House (disambiguation)
Alexander Smith House (disambiguation)
Benjamin Smith House (disambiguation)
Daniel Smith House (disambiguation)
Edwin Smith House (disambiguation)
George W. Smith House (disambiguation)
James Smith House (disambiguation)
Jesse N. Smith House (disambiguation)
John Smith House (disambiguation)
Henry Smith House (disambiguation)
Samuel Smith House (disambiguation)
Simeon Smith House (disambiguation)
Thomas Smith House (disambiguation)
William Smith House (disambiguation)